Malta is subdivided into 5 regions. Three regions were originally created by the Local Councils Act of 1993, and were integrated into the constitution in 2001. Two of the regions were split into smaller ones by Act No. XVI of 2009, and now there are five regions. Malta is divided into five regions without administrative functions.

Each region has a Regional Committee, which consists of a Regional President, a Vice President, an Executive Secretary and between 10 and 14 members.

List

Current regions

Former regions (1993–2009)

See also
Local councils of Malta
Districts of Malta
NUTS of Malta
ISO 3166-2:MT

References

 
Subdivisions of Malta
Geography of Malta